The Digilux 2 is a digital camera model sold by Leica Camera, with the body manufactured in Japan by Matsushita, which sold a variant as the Panasonic Lumix DMC-LC1. Its image sensor is a CCD with 5.24 million total pixels. It has a color, transreflective thin-film transistor liquid crystal display with 211,000 pixels, in addition to an electronic viewfinder. It has a near-focus range of 30 centimeters. The camera has a built-in flash. This flash, first of its kind, has the ability to be pointed up, as well as the standard method of pointing straight ahead, in order to "bounce" the light off a ceiling. The camera weighs 630 grams (without a battery). Its dimensions are 135 millimeters in width, 82 millimeters in height, and 103 millimeters in depth. The camera is fitted with a Leica Vario Summicron lens of f/2 with a zoom function of 28mm - 90mm in 35mm format.

The main selling point of the Digilux 2 is that it functions in a manner reminiscent of a rangefinder camera; the Leica lens features manual zoom, aperture and focus rings and the shutter speed can be manually adjusted via a dial on the camera. Many users cite the excellent Leica DC Vario-Summicron lens as their reason to purchase.

See also

 Leica Digilux 1
 Leica Digilux 3

References
http://www.dpreview.com/products/leica/compacts/leica_digilux2/specifications

External links
 Leica Digilux 2 review by Danish photographer Thorsten Overgaard
 John Thawley Discusses Leica Digilux 2
 John Thawley Compares Leica Digilux 2 and Panasonic DMC LC1
 Leica Camera Workshop Asia

Digilux 2